The 1918 South Armagh by-election was held on 2 February 1918.  The by-election was held due to the death of the incumbent Irish Parliamentary Party MP, Charles O'Neill.  It was won by the Irish Parliamentary candidate Patrick Donnelly.

References

1918 elections in the United Kingdom
By-elections to the Parliament of the United Kingdom in County Armagh constituencies
20th century in County Armagh
1918 elections in Ireland